The Rakhine State Cultural Museum is a museum that displays figurines of the Rakhine people and their traditional dress, traditional looms and arts of Rakhine people.

It was established in February 1996. The admission fee is 2 US $ and opening hours are from 10:00 am to 3:30 pm, Tuesday through Sunday.

References

Museums in Myanmar
Sittwe
Rakhine State
Museums established in 1996